Callundine lacordairei is a species of longhorn beetle in the subfamily Lamiinae, and the only species in the genus Callundine. It was described by Thomson in 1879. It is endemic to India.

References

Saperdini
Beetles described in 1879
Endemic fauna of India